The Harlech Grits Group is a lower to middle Cambrian lithostratigraphic group (a sequence of rock strata) in northwest Wales. The name is derived from the town of Harlech in Gwynedd.

Outcrops
The rocks are exposed beneath Harlech and across the Harlech Dome to its east; a broad anticlinal structure which encompasses the Rhinogydd range.

Lithology and stratigraphy
The group comprises about 2000m thickness of sandstone, mudstones, siltstones and greywackes laid down in the marine Welsh Basin during the early to mid Cambrian period. The group comprises (in descending order i.e., oldest last) the Gamlan Formation, the Barmouth Formation, the Hafotty Formation, the Rhinog Formation, the Llanbedr Formation and the Dolwen Formation.

References

Cambrian System of Europe
Geologic formations of Wales
Geography of Gwynedd
Cambrian Wales